The Weavers may refer to:
The Weavers, an American folk band
The Weavers: Wasn't That a Time!, a 1982 documentary film about the band
The Weavers (1905 film), a silent documentary film
The Weavers (play), by Gerhart Hauptmann
The Weavers (1927 film), a 1927 film adaptation of the play